|}

The Royal Hunt Cup is a flat handicap horse race in Great Britain open to horses aged three years or older. It is run at Ascot over a distance of 1 mile (1,609 metres), and it is scheduled to take place each year in June.

History
The event was established in 1843, and it was originally contested on a right-handed course over 7 furlongs and 166 yards. The inaugural running was won by Knight of the Whistle, with a triple dead-heat for second between Bourra Tomacha, Epaulette and Garry Owen.

The race's distance was shortened to 7 furlongs and 155 yards in 1930, and it was extended to its present length in 1956. It is now run on a straight course, and it usually features a large field.

The Royal Hunt Cup is currently held on the second day of the five-day Royal Ascot meeting. It is one of three perpetual trophies at the meeting, along with the Gold Cup and the Queen's Vase, which can be kept permanently by the winning owners.

Records
Most successful horse (2 wins):
 Master Vote – 1947, 1948

Leading jockey (4 wins):
 Charles Wood – Thuringian Prince (1875), The Mandarin (1879), Elzevir (1883), Gay Hermit (1887)
 Lester Piggott – Spaniard's Close (1963), Casabianca (1965), Kamundu (1969), Jumping Hill (1976)

Leading trainer (5 wins):
 James Jewitt – Sweetbread (1882), Elzevir (1883), Shillelagh (1888), Suspender (1892), Knight of the Thistle (1897)

Winners since 1980
 Weights given in stones and pounds.

Earlier winners

 1843: Knight of the Whistle
 1844: The Bishop of Romford's Cob
 1845: Evenus
 1846: Leaconfield
 1847: Tragical
 1848: Conyngham
 1849: Collingwood
 1850: Hagley
 1851: Sir Charles
 1852: Ephesus
 1853: The Friar
 1854: Brocket
 1855: Chalice
 1856: Forbidden Fruit
 1857: Rosa Bonheur
 1858: Hesperithusa
 1859: King at Arms
 1860: Crater
 1861: Buccaneer
 1862: Canary
 1863: Victor
 1864: Gem of the Sea
 1865: Gratitude
 1866: Attache
 1867: Jasper
 1868: Satyr
 1869: See Saw
 1870: Judge
 1871: Valuer
 1872: Ripponden
 1873: Winslow
 1874: Lowlander
 1875: Thuringian Prince
 1876: Hopbloom
 1877: Cradle
 1878: Julius Caesar
 1879: The Mandarin
 1880: Strathern
 1881: Peter
 1882: Sweetbread
 1883: Elzevir
 1884: Acrostic
 1885: Eastern Emperor
 1886: Despair
 1887: Gay Hermit
 1888: Shillelagh
 1889: Whitelegs
 1890: Morion
 1891: Laureate
 1892: Suspender
 1893: Amandier
 1894: Victor Wild
 1895: Clorane
 1896: Quarrel
 1897: Knight of the Thistle
 1898: Jaquemart
 1899: Refractor
 1900: Royal Flush
 1901: Stealaway
 1902: Solicitor
 1903: Kunstler
 1904: Csardas
 1905: Andover
 1906: Dinneford
 1907: Lally
 1908: Billy the Verger
 1909: Dark Ronald
 1910: Bachelor's Double
 1911: Moscato
 1912: Eton Boy
 1913: Long Set
 1914: Lie-a-bed
 1915–18: no race
 1919: Irish Elegance
 1920: Square Measure
 1921: Illuminator
 1922: Varzy
 1923: Weathervane
 1924: Dinkie
 1925: Cockpit
 1926: Cross Bow
 1927: Asterus
 1928: Priory Park
 1929: Songe
 1930: The MacNab
 1931: Grand Salute
 1932: Totaig
 1933: Colorado Kid
 1934: Caymanas
 1935: Priok
 1936: Guinea Gap
 1937: Fairplay
 1938: Couvert
 1939: Caerloptic
 1940: no race
 1941: Time Step *
 1942–44: no race
 1945: Battle Hymn
 1946: Friar's Fancy
 1947: Master Vote
 1948: Master Vote
 1949: Sterope
 1950: Hyperbole
 1951: Val d'Assa
 1952: Queen of Sheba
 1953: Choir Boy
 1954: Chivalry
 1955: Nicholas Nickleby
 1956: Alexander
 1957: Retrial
 1958: Amos
 1959: Faultless Speech
 1960: Small Slam
 1961: King's Troop
 1962: Smartie
 1963: Spaniard's Close
 1964: Zaleucus
 1965: Casabianca
 1966: Continuation
 1967: Regal Light
 1968: Golden Mean
 1969: Kamundu
 1970: Calpurnius
 1971: Picture Boy
 1972: Tempest Boy
 1973: Camouflage
 1974: Old Lucky
 1975: Ardoon
 1976: Jumping Hill
 1977: My Hussar
 1978: Fear Naught
 1979: Pipedreamer

* The race was run at Newbury in 1941.

See also
 Horse racing in Great Britain
 List of British flat horse races

References
 Paris-Turf:
 Racing Post:

 galopp-sieger.de – Royal Hunt Cup.
 pedigreequery.com – Royal Hunt Cup – Ascot.
 

Flat races in Great Britain
Ascot Racecourse
Open mile category horse races
Recurring sporting events established in 1843
1843 establishments in England